The Royal Military College of Canada Museum, established in 1962, is located in a Martello tower known as  Fort Frederick on the campus of the Royal Military College of Canada (RRMC or RMC) in Kingston, Ontario, and is operated by the college. Until 2016 the museum had regular hours from the last weekend in June until Labour Day. Although admission was free, donations were accepted. Guided tours were offered in English and French. Genealogical research and archival records services were offered relating to college history or with inquires relating to ex-cadets when permitted by privacy regulations.

In 2016, restoration work began on Fort Frederick and the Museum moved out of the Tower, leaving the Museum without a designated public exhibition space.

The museum and historic site can also be visited via the Virtual Museum.
The Martello tower housing the museum is a 1790 fortification consisting mostly of earthworks with a north wall of stone masonry. It is on the Registry of Historic Places of Canada. Fort Frederick is one of four Martello Towers, built by Corps of Royal Engineers between 1846 and 1848 to augment the Kingston defences. The Martello tower was named in honour of Frederick, Prince of Wales.

Purpose

The museum's purpose is to collect, conserve, research and display artifacts and records relating to the history of the RMCC, achievements of its graduates and the earlier naval history of its site, including the Kingston Royal Naval Dockyard which once occupied Point Frederick.

Collections

The museum also holds a small collection of material related to the Point Frederick dockyard and the Royal Navy.

The Royal Military College and other military units started to collect artifacts in a piecemeal way after the Great War. The college’s commandants indicated in 1918 that he wanted to establish a museum at RMC. Individual requests were made to the War Trophy Commission 1918–19 and artifacts were received over a period of time 1920-26. Major-General Sir Archibald Macdonell, who wished to establish a museum in 1919, wrote a letter to the Secretary of the Militia Council requesting, “that some of the various War Trophies captired [sic] by the Canadian Corps may be dispatched to the Royal Military College, for disposal about the grounds and buildings. Oweing [sic] to the record of the ex-cadets, it would be only fitting and right that the College be allowed certain trophies.” He noted that some trophies had been turned in from the field to the War Trophies Commission addressed to RMC, but had not yet been received. Major Gustave Lanctôt of the Dominion Archives replied in 1920 that the War Trophies Commission was waiting for governmental policy with respect to the distribution of War Trophies; [the College] “may be assured to receive the best treatment possible in view of the fine record of its students and the importance of its standing as a National Military College.”

In September 1922, an army board met at RMC to look at the possibility of creating a museum in Fort Frederick. In January 1926, the Quartermaster General wrote the RMC commandant: “It is the desire of National Defence Headquarters to make the museum at the Royal Military College the principal storehouse for military relics of all natures...” In February 1926, a 12 page inventory of RMC’s holdings included hundreds of small arms, bayonets, scabbards, swords, lances, pistols, machine guns, grenades and bombs, clothing, trench stores, artillery ammunition, engineering models, and other miscellaneous articles. Many of these holdings were of the 1914-1918 vintage, and, many had been captured from the Germans, particularly during 1918.

Between 1922 and 1946, the RMC collections consisted merely of arms and military artifacts collections raised, built and maintained by individuals or very small groups of veterans. Although these items were interesting, there was no overall, coordinated story.

Lady Lee widow of Arthur Lee, 1st Viscount Lee of Fareham presented to the Royal Military College of Canada Museum in 1947 a silver-headed walking stick of her late-husband: which he used daily at RMC fifty-four years earlier. The stick has two silver bands listing the places where Lee served -or visited from 1888 to 1904, which, includes Royal Military College of Canada. Lady Lee also presented the RMC Museum three photographs of Lord Lee - two of them taken in Kingston, one in uniform in 1893, and the other in 1896 wearing a checked suit, silver-topped stick in hand. The third is a photograph of the portrait by James Gunn in full regalia of a Knight Grand Cross of the Most Honourable Order of the Bath.

The museum displays collections of military memorabilia and 7000 items, including a collection of 16th through 20th century arms, uniforms, flags, military art and trophies. It holds, for example, the Douglas Arms Collection which was presented to RMC by Walter Douglas (RMC 1890). The Douglas Arms Collection contains over 400 guns that were originally in the ownership of Mexican President, General Porfirio Diaz. Another significant collection is the Leinster Plate, a collection of silverware, of the Prince of Wales's Leinster Regiment. The Nanton Arms collection was presented to RMC by No 78 Colborne J. Nanton (RMC 1882). The Nanton Arms Collection contains Indian daggers and various other arms that were originally presented by the Maharajah of Cooch Behar to Nanton during his service in India prior to the First World War. A model of the 112-gun  was donated in 2008. The lower floor of the Martello tower contains exhibits on the War of 1812 and the fort’s dockyard. The main floor contains exhibits on the history of the college, and personal mementos of the Old Eighteen, the first class that enrolled in 1876. A gun platform displays the original cannons at the top of the tower. The archives includes cartographic materials, prints and drawings, manuscripts and photographs. The human history consists of manuscripts, medals, military history and technology and weapons.

The museum is also responsible for a collection of Canadian landscape and military art, including paintings, sculpture, and stained glass windows on display throughout the college, though primarily in Currie Hall and Yeo Hall. The college announced in 2011 the establishment of an art venue in the New Learning Center.

Art collection
 
In 2010, Royal Military College of Canada Museum became responsible for the college’s art collection. The college's art collection consists of just over 1,000 two-dimensional works of art, such as paintings, limited edition prints, drawing]s and other works on paper. The three-dimensional works in the collection include sculptures and stained glass. Approximately 20% of the catalogued art collection at RMCC is on display at the college and the remaining 80% is in storage in Fort Haldimand.

There are works in the art collection by: Admiral Henry Wolsey Bayfield (1795–1885), Christopher Clark, Charles Comfort, Forshaw Day,  Jean Redpath Drummond (c. 1845 – c. 1920), Washington F. Friend (c. 1820 – 1886), Thomas Hilton Garside, Lawren Philip Harris, Edward John Hughes, Robert Stewart Hyndman, C.W. Jefferys, Manly MacDonald, Orlando Norie, Thomas Rowlandson, Richard Simkin, William Thurston Topham (1888–1966) and Emeric Essex Vidal (1791–1861). 
 
The works may have been presented to the college by ex-cadets or by graduating classes on the occasion of reunions, as memorials, as commissions or purchases. The Gauthier Collection, gifted by the Class of 1974, consists of 60 military sculptures and bas reliefs by Col (Ret’d) André Gauthier, OMM, CD., including one of a Royal Military College of Canada Cadet. A watercolour of ex-cadet #444 Major-General William Bethune Lindsay, CB, CMG, DSO by Canadian artist Richard George Mathews (1870–1955), for example, was donated by ex-cadet, #10263 Don Lovell, in 1981. A landscape painting of a lumber camp in early spring by Manly Edward MacDonald (1889–1971), for example was presented by Dr. Clarence C Cook (#H6890) in 1968 on the occasion of the Class of 1918's 50th anniversary. A posthumous 3/4 length portrait of No. 1557 Colonel William Reginald Sawyer, Director of Studies 1948–1967 standing in front of the Mackenzie Building and the Stone Frigate in his academic robes was commissioned by Charles Fraser Comfort (1900–1994). Mr. John Spurr, the former RMC librarian, acquired items addressing military and political events in late 18th and early 19th century North America, limited edition maps and prints of key battles, caricatures by Thomas Rowlandson, political cartoons, and illustrations of uniforms. Mr. John Spurr acquired watercolour paintings depicting Siege of Ciudad Rodrigo (1812) Jan. 19th 1812, by Richard Simkin (1840–1926); the Battle of Fuentes de Oñoro 5 May 1811, by Orlando Norie (1832–1901); and the ruins of Ypres Cathedral with Canadian troops in the foreground, Nov. 1917 by Christopher Clark (1875–1942). Two panoramic watercolours c 1815 depict Point Frederick and Kingston Harbour and Sackett’s Harbour in New York
by Emeric Essex Vidal.

Memberships and affiliations
The museum is a member of the Canadian Museums Association and the Organization of Military Museums of Canada Inc. It is also accredited within the Canadian Forces Museum System. It is affiliated with the  Canadian Heritage Information Network, and the Virtual Museum of Canada. A cooperating association of friends of the museum has been formed to assist with projects. 
The Parks Canada Agency often participates in joint programs, or provides supporting resources to the Royal Military College of Canada Museum, which is a partner organization.

War trophies 
The Royal Military College of Canada Museum curator oversees the trophies and memorials on the college grounds.

Memorials

See also

 Military history of Canada
 History of the Canadian Army

References

Brochures
 Royal Military College of Canada, Fort Frederick: Facts brochure, (Kingston, 2000).
 Royal Military College of Canada, Visit Fort Frederick and the Royal Military College of Canada Museum brochure, (Kingston, 2000).
Books

External links
RMC Virtual Museum

Military and war museums in Canada
History museums in Ontario
Museums in Kingston, Ontario
University museums in Canada
Royal Military College of Canada
Buildings and structures in Kingston, Ontario